Jamiat Ahle Hadith Jammu and Kashmir is an Islamic Ahl-i Hadith organization based in Srinagar, Jammu and Kashmir, India. It operates under the parent all-India Jamiat Ahle Hadith Hind, the main motive of which is to practice and propagate the Ahl-i Hadith movement (Salafism). The organization has lakhs of followers across the country.

It has many educational centers across the state imparting the Islamic education and some schools operating under Jammu & Kashmir Board of School Education (such as the Salfia Muslim Institute). The organization planned to open a university but hasn't been able to do so due to some government concerns. The planned university was to be named "Trans World Muslim University". 

Its headquarters are located in Barbarshah, Srinagar. It holds religious conferences across the state each year in which many scholars of India actively participate. The organization has many charitable diagnostic test centers in Kashmir which provide medical facilities at a relatively less and affordable cost. The main test center is located at headquarters in Barbashah locality of Srinagar and samples are collected at different places like Soura.

The former president of the organization Showkat Ahmad Shah was killed in a blast when he was approaching the grand mosque in Gawkadal for Friday prayers. Professor Ghulam Mohammad Bhat AlMadani is the current president, Dr. Abdul Lateef Al-Kindee its vice-president and Abdul Hakeem Wani the general secretary. Mufti Muhammad Yaqoob Baba Al-Madani serves as the grand mufti and amir.

Structure 
The organization operates under the following structure:

 Amir : Equivalent of president, is the executive head of the organisation.
 Two vice-presidents: one each for Jammu and Jhelum (Kashmir Valley). They assist the president in administrative work and VP Jehlum acts as president if the president is absent.
 Secretary organisation: This person looks after organisational frame work and acts as chairman of the Salafia Muslim Educational and Research Trust.
 Secretary Media And Publications
 Secretary Finance
 Sectetary Waqf
 Secretary Islamic Call (Dawah)

The organisation has the lowest level as Unit Jamiat which functions as the practical institutions in every locality in Jammu and Kashmir. They are organized in ascending order as Halqa Jamiat, Unit Jamiat, Tehsil Jamiat, District Jamiat.

The organisation operates about 900 masjids across the state and affiliated with every masjid is a madarasa.

Education 
It is primarily an Islamic organisation devoted to the propagation of Islamic teachings in Jammu and Kashmir. It operates numerous primary Islamic educational institutions in almost every locality of the state. It also operates modern secular educational institutions which number around 150, these include higher secondaries (Higher Secondary School Certificate), high schools and primary schools. Prominent among higher secondaries are:

 Salafi Muslim Institute, Srinagar
 Salafi Muslim Institute, Anantnag

It operates many colleges affiliated with the Islamic University of Madinah, including:

 Salafia College for Boys, Mominabad, Srinagar
 Salafia College for Girls, Iqbalabad, Srinagar
 Salafia College for Girls, Anantnag
 Darul Quran, Banihal

Notable people 
  Mohammad Anwar Shopiani
  Showkat Ahmed Shah

References

Islamic organisations based in India
Ahl-i Hadith
1922 establishments in India
Salafi groups
20th-century establishments in Jammu and Kashmir